Alan Smart is a retired animator and an animation director best known for his work as the supervising director on SpongeBob SquarePants, which he has been involved with since the pilot, and as assistant director and layout artist on The Simpsons (he also received credit as a director in the season three episode, "Flaming Moe's").

He has done animation for the Nicktoons CatDog, Hey Arnold, Rocko's Modern Life, Ren and Stimpy, and Sanjay and Craig and on five animated films: The Little Mermaid, The SpongeBob SquarePants Movie, The SpongeBob SquarePants Movie: Sponge Out of Water, Oliver & Company and The Chipmunk Adventure.

Alan Smart also worked on the pilot episode of Family Dog, as an animation director on Clone High and the first season of Rugrats.

Filmography

Television

Film

References

External links
 
Alan Smart on LinkedIn

Living people
American television directors
American animated film directors
Year of birth missing (living people)